Macrosoma ustrinaria is a moth-like butterfly in the family Hedylidae. It was described by Gottlieb August Wilhelm Herrich-Schäffer in 1854.

References

Hedylidae
Butterflies described in 1854